Sergio Pupovac (born 5 July 1979), also known as Serdo or Serdjio Pupovac, is a retired French-born Luxembourgish footballer who played as a striker.

Club career
Pupovac started his career at French fifth division side Levallois SC before moving to Luxembourg.

He topped the Luxembourg National Division goalscoring table, with 24 goals for Racing FC's predecessor club, CS Alliance 01, in 2004-05.

In 2009 he has played 5 matches for the Luxembourg national football team.

References

External links
 Profile at national-football-teams.com
 Player profile - RFC Union

1979 births
Living people
Sportspeople from Argenteuil
Association football forwards
Luxembourgian footballers
Luxembourg international footballers
French footballers
Luxembourgian people of Serbian descent
Luxembourgian people of French descent
French people of Serbian descent
Racing FC Union Luxembourg players
Levallois SC players
FC UNA Strassen players
Footballers from Val-d'Oise